Chopper Squad is an Australian television series produced by the Reg Grundy Organisation for the 0-10 Network (as it was then known).

The series recounted the work of a helicopter rescue team operating on Dee Why beach in Sydney.

Production

Pilot
The original pilot was made in 1976, airing in Melbourne in November 1976 and Newcastle (NSW) in August 1977. There was quite a time lag between the pilot and the series going to air in May 1978.

As with many series there were changes between the initial pilot and the series. Three actors from the pilot did not continue into the series - Rebecca Gilling, Max Osbiston and Tony Bonner. Additionally, the surnames of characters Phil and Tim were changed.

Series
The pilot was followed by two series with a total of 26 episodes airing between 1978 and 1979. Shortly after the show began, the " rescue helicopter base" moved its operations from Dee Why Beach Surf Life Saving Club to Palm Beach Surf Lifesaving Club.

Cast

Main cast 
The leading cast members included Dennis Grosvenor who played rescuer Jebbie Best, Robert Coleby, Eric Oldfield, Jeanie Drynan and Tony Hughes.

Guest actors 
Notable guest actors included Tom Richards, Rebecca Gilling, Vincent Ball, Christine Amor, Alwyn Kurts, Anne Haddy, Joanna Lockwood, Zoe Bertram, John Clayton, Lucky Grills, Adrian Wright, Normie Rowe, Carmen Duncan, Candy Raymond, Peter Bensley, Don Barker,  Brian Wenzel, Belinda Giblin, Tina Bursill, John Fegan, Serge Lazareff, Maggie Kirkpatrick, Ian Gilmour, Vince Martin, Delvene Delaney, Patsy King, James Condon, Chris Orchard, Gordon Piper, Abigail, Nick Tate, Richard Moir, Vincent Gil, Elizabeth Alexander, George Spartels, Shane Porteous, Gerda Nicolson, Sigrid Thornton, Sean Scully, Briony Behets, Alan Cinis and Diane Craig.

The helicopters

VH-UCH

VH-UCH, a Bell 206A, only appeared in the pilot.

VH-FHF

VH-FHF was used for the main series. In real life VH-FHF a Bell 206B "Jet Ranger II" was initially used from approximately 1977 by Westpac Life Saver Rescue Helicopter Service, that was established by Surf Life Saving Australia in 1973 on an initial sponsorship of $25 000 from the Bank of New South Wales (now Westpac).

After serving the Wales rescue team, VH-FHF was bought by PHS, professional helicopter services. It's still in operations serving the Government of Victoria as Firebird 301 and does tourist flights at Uluru. The JetRanger VH-FHF became registered VH-PHF.

VH-FHF registration number was given to a MBB Kawasaki BK-117B-2.
The "new" VH-FHF is operated by the NSW Rural Fire Service.

Home media 

As of 5 June 2019 there is no DVD Release of the series.

References

External links
 
Chopper Squad at Classic Australian Television
Chopper Squad at AustLit
Chopper Squad at the National Film and Sound Archive

Australian drama television series
Television shows set in New South Wales
Network 10 original programming
Television series by CBS Studios
Aviation television series
1976 Australian television series debuts
1979 Australian television series endings
English-language television shows
Television series produced by The Reg Grundy Organisation